Suvaja may refer to:

 Suvaja (Kruševac), a village in Serbia
 Suvaja, Bosanski Petrovac, a village in Bosnia and Herzegovina
 Suvaja (Blace), a village in Serbia
 Suvaja (Kozarska Dubica), a village in Bosnia and Herzegovina
 Suvaja (Varvarin), a village in Serbia